Gloanna is a genus of moths of the family Noctuidae. The genus was described by Nye in 1975.

Species
 Gloanna grisescens (Barnes & Lindsey, 1921)
 Gloanna hecate Blanchard & Knudson, 1983
 Gloanna mexicana (Dyar, 1912)

References

Hadeninae